Terminalia porphyrocarpa is a species of tree native to dry rainforests of Northeastern Australia and Papua New Guinea.

Image gallery

References

http://www.anbg.gov.au/abrs/online-resources/flora/stddisplay.xsql?pnid=47210

porphyrocarpa
Flora of Queensland
Bushfood